Bocephus King is an Indie artist from Vancouver, British Columbia, Canada. His discography includes Joco Music released in 1996 by Tonic Records, A Small Good Thing released in 1998 by New West Records, The Blue Sickness released in 2000 by Tonic Records, and All Children Believe In Heaven released in 2004 by Tonic Records and Willie Dixon God Damn released in 2011 by Tonic Records.

References

Canadian folk rock musicians
Musicians from Vancouver
Living people
Year of birth missing (living people)